Pinós is a village and municipality in Catalonia, Spain.

Pinos may also refer to:

 El Pinós or Pinoso, a town near the Alicante/Murcia border, Spain
 Mount Pinos, a mountain in California, US
 Isla de Pinos, former name of the Cuban island Isla de la Juventud
 Battle of Pinos, a naval engagement
 Pinos, Zacatecas, a town in Mexico
 Pinos Municipality, the municipality containing the town of Pinos, Zacatecas
 Pinos volcanic complex, extinct volcanic complex in the Pinos Municipality, Zacatecas

See also
 Jorge Pinos (born 1989), Ecuadorian footballer
 Los Pinos (disambiguation)
 Pino (disambiguation)